Methoxytoluenes (methylanisoles or cresyl methyl ethers) are a group of three isomeric organic compounds with the formula CH3OC6H4CH3.  They  consist of a disubstituted benzene ring with methoxy group and one methyl group.  All three are colorless flammable liquids which are soluble in organic solvents but poorly soluble in water.  They are not of major commercial interest although they are precursors to the corresponding methoxybenzoic acids and methoxybenzaldehydes.

Chemical properties

See also
 Phenetole, a structural isomer

References

Phenol ethers
Alkyl-substituted benzenes
C